The 12.7 cm/50 Type 3 naval gun was a medium-caliber naval gun of the Imperial Japanese Navy used during World War II. It was the standard weapon for Japanese destroyers between 1928 and 1944 (except Akizuki and Matsu classes). It has been credited as a true dual-purpose gun, but this was more a nominal capability than real, as its bag propellant and need for hand ramming required the gun to be loaded at elevation angles of 5–10°. This dropped its rate of fire to a relatively slow 5–10 rounds per minute, and its training speed of only 6° per second meant that it had a great deal of difficulty engaging enemy aircraft with any chance of success. After the end of World War II the gun remained in service on the two Japanese destroyers ceded to the Soviet Union and the Republic of China as war reparations.

Description 
The 50-caliber  Type 3 gun was of built-up construction, originally with three and later two layers with the usual breech ring and breech bush. It used a Welin interrupted screw breech and powder bags, unusual for guns of that caliber. The shell was fuzed manually on the loading tray before being rammed by hand and could only be loaded at elevations between 5° and 10°. All mounts used pusher-type shell hoists, but the powder bags were passed by hand.

Mountings 
These guns were first used in the twin gun Model A turret on the revolutionary s. These were the first weatherproof, splinterproof and gas-proof enclosed gun turrets ever mounted on a destroyer. Guns in twin mounts were in individual cradles and could elevate separately. All mounts could traverse at 6° per second and could elevate at a rate between 6° and 12° per second although speeds up to 27° per second have been reported.

The twin gun Model A mount was fitted with a  gun shield. Its guns could depress −5° and elevate to +40°. These mounts were deployed on the first ten Fubuki-class destroyers. The twin gun Model B mount had its elevation increased to 75° and was fitted in the rest of the Fubuki-class as well as the  destroyers. The first four of the  used the Model B mod 2 mount although how it differed from the earlier Model B mount is unknown.

The Type A single mount could depress −7° and elevate to +75°, but the Type B reduced the maximum elevation to 55°. The Type A was fitted on the Hatsuharu class and the Type B on the Shiratsuyu-class destroyers.

Ammunition 
After 1943, a flat-nosed anti-submarine shell also became available.

See also

Weapons of comparable role, performance and era
 5"/38-caliber gun: US Navy equivalent dual-purpose gun
 QF 4.5-inch Mk I – V naval gun: British equivalent dual-purpose gun
 12.7 cm SK C/34 naval gun: German equivalent limited to low-angle fire
 12.8 cm FlaK 40: Dedicated anti-aircraft, land-based German gun of equal caliber

Notes

References 
 
 
 OCLC 77257764

External links 

 

World War II naval weapons
Naval guns of Japan
127 mm artillery
Military equipment introduced in the 1920s